István Aranyos (25 April 1942 – 22 September 2022) was a Hungarian gymnast. He competed at the 1964 Summer Olympics and the 1968 Summer Olympics.

References

External links

1942 births
2022 deaths
Hungarian male artistic gymnasts
Olympic gymnasts of Hungary
Gymnasts at the 1964 Summer Olympics
Gymnasts at the 1968 Summer Olympics
Gymnasts from Budapest